Goodhope Bay is a small bay in the Kotzebue Sound, on the Chukchi Sea-facing coast of Alaska.

It is located on the northern coast of the Seward Peninsula, 30 mi. W of Deering; Kotzebue-Kobuk Low .

Lieutenant Otto von Kotzebue named the area while exploring the region in August 1816, as he had had "good hope" in making important geographic discoveries.

References
 

Bays of Alaska
Bodies of water of Northwest Arctic Borough, Alaska
Bays of the Chukchi Sea